Machado is a former settlement in Los Angeles County, California. It lay at an elevation of 13 feet (4 m).

Machado was a stop on the Venice–Inglewood Line just north of Alla Junction; the line, which dated to the late 19th century, was lightly used for both passengers and freight. Machado still appeared on USGS maps as of 1934.

Machado is a name derived from Portuguese meaning "hatchet", but the stop was probably named for the Machado family of the Rancho era. Circa 1878 an application was made to the Post Office Department for a new post office station to be called Machado, located northwest quarter section 12 township 2W range 15 west, half a mile north of Ballona Creek and one mile west of La Ballona station.

See also
 Alla, California
 Motordrome, California
 Alsace, California
 Cypress Grove, California

References

Former settlements in Los Angeles County, California
Former populated places in California